Saint-Suliac (Gallo: Saent-Suliau) is a commune in the Ille-et-Vilaine department in Brittany in northwestern France. It is one of Les Plus Beaux Villages de France.

Population
Inhabitants of Saint-Suliac are called Suliaçais in French.

See also
Communes of the Ille-et-Vilaine department

References

External links

Mayors of Ille-et-Vilaine Association 

Communes of Ille-et-Vilaine
Plus Beaux Villages de France